A select number of decisions from the Courts of Appeal have proven to be the leading case law in a number of fields and have subsequently been adopted across all provinces, or else they are famous decisions in their own right. Most frequently the decisions were never appealed or were denied leave to the Supreme Court of Canada. The notable decisions of these courts are listed in chronological order by province.

Federal Court of Appeal
 Tele-Direct (Publications) Inc. v. American Business Informations Inc. (1997) 76 CPR (3d) 296
 Englander v. Telus Communications Inc., 2004 FCA 387 - privacy, PIPEDA
 BMG Canada Inc. v. Doe, 2005 FCA 193 - privacy rights of filesharers
 Hinzman v. Canada (2006) - refugee protection for deserters of a war that began without UN approval
 Church of Atheism of Central Canada v Canada (National Revenue)

British Columbia Court of Appeal
 Vancouver Rape Relief Society v. Nixon, 2005 BCCA 601 - protection of women's equality right to determine membership in equality-seeking organization

Court of Appeal for Ontario
 Tilden Rent-A-Car Co. v. Clendenning (1978), 83 DLR (3d) 400, 18 OR (2d) 601 (Ont CA) - contracts of adhesion
 R. v. Buzzanga and Durocher (1979), 25 OR (2d) 705 (CA) - criminal culpability
 Blainey v. Ontario Hockey Association (1986), 14 OAC 194 - Human Rights
 Zylberberg v. Sudbury Board of Education, (1988)
 R. v. Church of Scientology of Toronto (1996), 33 OR (3d) 65, 116 CCC (3d) 1
 R. v. Pintar, (1996), 2 CR (5th) 151 (Ont CA)
 Gould Estate v. Stoddart Publishing Co. Ltd. (1998), 39 OR 555, 161 DLR (4th) 321 - copyright
 General Accident Assurance Co. v. Chrusz (1999), 180 DLR (4th) 241 (Ont CA) - solicitor client privilege
 Chippewas of Sarnia Band v. Canada (Attorney General) (2000), 51 OR (3d) 641, 195 DLR (4th) 135 (Ont CA) - aboriginal title
 Halpern v. Canada (Attorney General), [2003] OJ No 2268 - same sex marriage
 Hitzig v. Canada (2003) 231 DLR (4th) 104, 177 CCC (3d) 449
 Freeman-Maloy v. Marsden (2006), 79 OR (3d) 401, 267 DLR (4th) 37
 Indalex Limited (Re), 2011 ONCA 265 - priority of claims of pension fund in a company bankruptcy;   leave to appeal granted by the Supreme Court of Canada, December 1, 2011.
 Bedford v. Canada, 2012 ONCA 186 - challenge of prostitution laws under the Charter

See also
 List of Supreme Court of Canada cases
 List of notable Canadian lower court cases
 List of Vancouver court cases

References

External links 
Top Ten Cited Canadian Court Cases

Courts of Appeal cases
 Cases